St. George's Church is in St George's Square, Barrow-in-Furness, Cumbria, England. It is the oldest active Anglican parish church in the town.  The church is in the deanery of Barrow, the archdeaconry of Westmorland and Furness, and the diocese of Carlisle. Its benefice is united with those of St Aidan, Newbarns, St Luke, Risedale, and St Perran, Roose, to form the South Barrow Team Ministry. The church is recorded in the National Heritage List for England as a designated Grade II listed building. It stands at the southeast extremity of the town.

History
The church was built between 1859 and 1861, to a design by the Lancaster architect E. G. Paley. Its patrons were the Duke of Buccleuch and the Duke of Devonshire. It was built at the suggestion of Sir James Ramsden to be the parish church in the developing town of Barrow-in-Furness. However it was left in a peripheral position as the town grew away from it, and especially when the railway station was relocated in 1882. The north aisle was added in 1867 by Paley, increasing the seating capacity to nearly 1,000.  In 1883 the Ramsden Chapel was added, and the chancel was increased in size, being made higher and longer.  In the Ramsden Chapel seating was added for use in civic occasions.  This work was carried out by the partnership of Paley and Austin.  The stained glass in the east window was destroyed in the Second World War. In 1982 the north aisle was partitioned off, and most of its furnishings were removed.  Since the partitioning, the north aisle has been used as a church hall.

Architecture

Exterior
St. George's is constructed in dry-jointed slate with red sandstone dressings; the roofs are slated. The slate came from the Duke of Devonshire's quarries at Kirkby, and the sandstone from St Bees.  Its plan consists of a five-bay nave with north and south aisles under separate roofs, south and west porches, a two-bay chancel with a chapel to the south, an organ chamber and a vestry to the north, and a tower at the west end of the south aisle. The tower is in three stages with diagonal buttresses, and an octagonal stair turret at its southeast corner. The parapet is embattled. The windows contain Geometric tracery.

Interior

The arcades are carried on alternate octagonal and circular piers, their capitals being carved with foliage. The stained glass in the east window dates from 1951 and was designed by A. F. Erridge of Whipple and Company. Also in the church is stained glass by Hardman, and by Shrigley and Hunt.  The church had a three-manual organ built in 1881 by Young, but this was scrapped in the 1980s and replaced with an electronic organ.

See also

List of ecclesiastical works by E. G. Paley
List of ecclesiastical works by Paley and Austin
List of places of worship in Barrow-in-Furness
Listed buildings in Barrow-in-Furness

References
Citations

Sources

Saint Georges Church
Church of England church buildings in Cumbria
Diocese of Carlisle
Grade II listed churches in Cumbria
Gothic Revival church buildings in England
Gothic Revival architecture in Cumbria
Churches completed in 1861
19th-century Church of England church buildings
Churches completed in 1883
Church buildings by E. G. Paley
Paley and Austin buildings
1861 establishments in England